"Hace Tiempo" is a Tropipop song by Colombian recording artist Fonseca. It was released as the third single from his second studio album Corazón (2006) at the same year.

Track listings
 Album version
 "Hace Tiempo" – 3:37

CD single
 "Hace Tiempo" (Album version) – 3:37
 "Hace Tiempo" (Salsatón version) – 3:48

Charts

References 

2006 singles
Fonseca (singer) songs
Spanish-language songs
2005 songs
EMI Latin singles
Songs written by Fonseca (singer)